Portland is the most populous municipality in the U.S. state of Maine and the seat of Cumberland County. Portland's population was 68,408 in April 2020. The Greater Portland metropolitan area is home to over half a million people, the 104th-largest metropolitan area in the United States. Portland's economy relies mostly on the service sector and tourism. The Old Port is known for its nightlife and 19th-century architecture. Marine industry plays an important role in the city's economy, with an active waterfront that supports fishing and commercial shipping. The Port of Portland is the second-largest tonnage seaport in New England.

The city seal depicts a phoenix rising from ashes, a reference to recovery from four devastating fires. Portland was named after the English Isle of Portland. In turn, the city of Portland, Oregon was named after Portland, Maine. The word Portland is derived from the Old English word Portlanda, which means "land surrounding a harbor". The Greater Portland area has emerged as an important center for the creative economy, which is also bringing gentrification.

History

Native Americans originally called the Portland peninsula Machigonne ("Great Neck"). Portland was named for the English Isle of Portland, and the city of Portland, Oregon, was in turn named for Portland, Maine. The first European settler was Capt. Christopher Levett, an English naval captain granted  in 1623 to found a settlement in Casco Bay. A member of the Council for New England and agent for Ferdinando Gorges, Levett built a stone house where he left a company of ten men, then returned to England to write a book about his voyage to bolster support for the settlement. Ultimately, the settlement was a failure and the fate of Levett's colonists is unknown. The explorer sailed from England to the Massachusetts Bay Colony to meet John Winthrop in 1630, but never returned to Maine. Fort Levett in the harbor is named for him.

The peninsula was settled in 1632 as a fishing and trading village named Casco. When the Massachusetts Bay Colony took over Casco Bay in 1658, the town's name changed again to Falmouth. In 1676, the village was destroyed by the Abenaki during King Philip's War. It was rebuilt. During King William's War, a raiding party of French and their native allies attacked and largely destroyed it again in the Battle of Fort Loyal (1690).

On October 18, 1775, Falmouth was burned in the Revolution by the Royal Navy under command of Captain Henry Mowat. Following the war, a section of Falmouth called The Neck developed as a commercial port and began to grow rapidly as a shipping center. In 1786, the citizens of Falmouth formed a separate town in Falmouth Neck and named it Portland, after the isle off the coast of Dorset, England. Portland's economy was greatly stressed by the Embargo Act of 1807 (prohibition of trade with the British), which ended in 1809, and the War of 1812, which ended in 1815.

In 1820, Maine was established as a state with Portland as its capital. In 1832, the capital was moved north and East to Augusta. In 1851, Maine led the nation by passing the first state law prohibiting the sale of alcohol except for "medicinal, mechanical or manufacturing purposes." The law subsequently became known as the Maine Law, as 18 states quickly followed. On June 2, 1855, the Portland Rum Riot occurred.

In 1853, upon completion of the Grand Trunk Railway to Montreal, Portland became the primary ice-free winter seaport for Canadian exports. The Portland Company, located on Fore Street, manufactured more than 600 19th-century steam locomotives, as well as engines for trains and boats, fire engines and other railroad transportation equipment. The Portland Company was, for a time, the city's largest employer and many of its employees were immigrants from Canada, Ireland and Italy. Portland became a 20th-century rail hub as five additional rail lines merged into Portland Terminal Company in 1911. These rail lines also facilitated movement of returning Canadian troops from the First World War in 1919. Following nationalization of the Grand Trunk system in 1923, Canadian export traffic was diverted from Portland to Halifax, Nova Scotia, resulting in marked local economic decline. In the 20th century, icebreakers later enabled ships to reach Montreal in winter, drastically reducing Portland's role as a winter port for Canada.

On June 26, 1863, a Confederate raiding party led by Captain Charles Read entered the harbor at Portland leading to the Battle of Portland Harbor, one of the northernmost battles of the Civil War. The 1866 Great Fire of Portland, Maine, on July 4, 1866, ignited during the Independence Day celebration, destroyed most of the commercial buildings in the city, half the churches and hundreds of homes. More than 10,000 people were left homeless.

By act of the Maine Legislature in 1899, Portland annexed the city of Deering, despite a vote by Deering residents rejecting the annexation, thereby greatly increasing the size of the city and opening areas for development beyond the peninsula.

In 1967, the city began the controversial razing of Franklin Street to construct a limited access highway to speed access in an out of the city for nonresidents. The reconstruction of the street demolished 130 homes and businesses and caused an unknown number of families to be relocated or displaced. The construction of The Maine Mall, an indoor shopping center established in the suburb of South Portland, during the 1970s, economically depressed downtown Portland. The trend reversed when tourists and new businesses started revitalizing the old seaport, a part of which is known locally as the Old Port. 

Since the 1990s, the historically industrial Bayside neighborhood has seen rapid development, including attracting a Whole Foods and Trader Joe's supermarkets, as well as Baxter Academy for Technology and Science, an increasingly popular charter school. Other rapidly developing neighborhoods include the India Street neighborhood near the Ocean Gateway and Munjoy Hill, where many modern condos have been built. The Maine College of Art has been a revitalizing force downtown, attracting students from around the country.  The historic Porteous building on Congress Street was restored by the college. Universities operating in the city are expanding. The University of Southern Maine is expanding its Portland campus with a 580-bed dorm, student center, and an arts center. The University of New England intends to move its medical school from its Biddeford campus to its Portland campus. Northeastern University's Roux Institute plans to build on the former B&M Baked Beans factory campus in East Deering. Portland is known as a walkable city, offering many opportunities for walking tours that feature its maritime and architectural history.

Geography

Portland is situated on a peninsula in Casco Bay on the Gulf of Maine and the Atlantic Ocean.

Portland borders South Portland, Westbrook and Falmouth. The city is located at 43.66713 N, 70.20717 W.

Climate
Portland has a humid continental climate (Köppen: Dfb, closely bordering on Dfa), with cold, snowy, and often prolonged winters, and warm, relatively short summers. The area can be affected by severe nor'easters during winter, with high winds and snowfall totals often measuring over a foot. Annual liquid precipitation (rain) averages  and is plentiful year-round, but with a slightly drier summer. Annual frozen precipitation (snow) averages  in the city. However, neighborhoods away from the immediate coast average slightly more, as the warmer ocean waters and onshore flow can cause snow to transition to sleet or rain along the coast. In Southern Maine, winter-season snowstorms can be intense from November through early April, while warm-season thunderstorms are somewhat less frequent than in the Midwestern, Mid-Atlantic, and Southeastern U.S. (although their frequency has increased in recent years). Direct strikes by hurricanes or tropical storms are rare, partially due to the normally cooler Atlantic waters off the Maine coast (which usually weaken tropical systems), but primarily because most tropical systems approaching or reaching 40 degrees North latitude recurve (due to the Coriolis force) and track east out to sea well south of the Portland area. The hardiness zones are 5b and 6a.

Sea-level rise
Portland is becoming increasingly affected by global warming and the rise of sea levels. The coast is one of the fastest-warming saltwater bodies and is predicted to see an increase to about 10-17 inches by 2030, in comparison to the levels in 2000. This is a major threat to the residents and ocean life around the area. In 2022, the National Oceanic and Atmospheric Administration issued a report that showed sea level in Portland could rise by six inches by 2050, two feet by 2060 and two to six feet by 2100.

Neighborhoods

Portland is organized into neighborhoods generally recognized by residents, but they have no legal or political authority. In many cases, city signs identify neighborhoods or intersections (which are often called corners). Most city neighborhoods have a local association which usually maintains ongoing relations of varying degrees with the city government on issues affecting the neighborhood.

On March 8, 1899, Portland annexed the neighboring city of Deering. Deering neighborhoods now comprise the northern and eastern sections of the city before the merger. Portland's Deering High School was formerly the public high school for Deering.

Portland's neighborhoods include the Arts District, Bayside, Bradley's Corner, Cliff Island, Cushing's Island, Deering Center, Deering Highlands, Downtown, East Deering, East Bayside, East End, Eastern Cemetery, Great Diamond Island, Highlands, Kennedy Park, Libbytown, Little Diamond Island, Lunt's Corner, Morrill's Corner, Munjoy Hill, Nason's Corner, North Deering, Oakdale, the Old Port, Parkside, Peaks Island, Riverton Park, Rosemont, Stroudwater, West End, and Woodford's Corner.

From the early 2000s onward, many of Portland's neighborhoods have faced gentrification, causing many local residents to be "priced out" of their neighborhoods. In 2015, the Portland Press Herald published a series of articles documenting the "super-tight apartment market" and the trauma caused by evictions and steep jumps in monthly rent. Also in that year, city landlords raised rents by an average of 17.4%, which was the second-largest jump in the country.

Demographics

2010 census
As of the census of 2010, there were 66,194 people, 30,725 households, and 13,324 families residing in the city. The racial makeup of the city was 85.0% White (83.6% non-Hispanic White alone), down from 96.6% in 1990, 7.1% African American, 0.5% Native American, 3.5% Asian, 1.2% from other races, and 2.7% from two or more races. Hispanic or Latino of any race were 3.0% of the population. 40.7% of the population had a bachelor's degree or higher.

There were 30,725 households, of which 20.7% had children under the age of 18 living with them, 29.7% were married couples living together, 10.1% had a female householder with no husband present, 3.6% had a male householder with no wife present, and 56.6% were non-families. 40.5% of all households were made up of individuals, and 11.4% had someone living alone who was 65 years of age or older. The average household size was 2.07 and the average family size was 2.88.

The median age in the city was 36.7 years. 17.1% of residents were under the age of 18; 11.4% were between the ages of 18 and 24; 33.1% were from 25 to 44; 25.9% were from 45 to 64; and 12.6% were 65 years of age or older. The gender makeup of the city was 48.8% male and 51.2% female.

2000 census
As of the census of 2000, there were 64,250 people, 29,714 households, and 13,549 families residing in the city.

According to the U.S. Census Bureau, Portland's immediate metropolitan area ranked 147th in the nation in 2000 with a population of 243,537, while the Portland/South Portland/Biddeford metropolitan area included 487,568 total inhabitants. This has increased to an estimated 513,102 inhabitants (and the largest metro area in Northern New England) . Much of this increase in population has been due to growth in the city's southern and western suburbs.

The racial makeup of the city was 91.27% White, 2.59% African American, 0.47% Native American, 3.08% Asian, 0.06% Pacific Islander, 0.67% from other races, and 1.86% from two or more races. Hispanic or Latino of any race were 1.52% of the population.

The largest ancestries include: British (including Scottish, Welsh, and English) (21.2%), Irish (19.2%), French (10.8%), Italian (10.5%), and German (6.9%).

There were 29,714 households, out of which 21.4% had children under the age of 18 living with them, 32.1% were married couples living together, 10.5% had a female householder with no husband present, and 54.4% were non-families. 40.1% of all households were made up of individuals, and 11.5% had someone living alone who was 65 years of age or older. The average household size was 2.08 and the average family size was 2.89.

In the city, the population was spread out, with 18.8% under the age of 18, 10.7% from 18 to 24, 36.1% from 25 to 44, 20.6% from 45 to 64, and 13.9% who were 65 years of age or older. The median age was 36 years. For every 100 females, there were 91.8 males. For every 100 females age 18 and over, there were 89.0 males.

The median income for a household in the city was $35,650, and the median income for a family was $48,763. Males had a median income of $31,828 versus $27,173 for females. The per capita income for the city was $22,698. About 9.7% of families and 14.1% of the population were below the poverty line, including 12.5% of those under age 18 and 11.9% of those age 65 or over.

Race/ethnicity composition

Economy

Portland has become Maine's economic capital because the city has Maine's largest port, largest population, and is close to Boston (105 miles to the southwest). Over the years, the local economy has shifted from fishing, manufacturing, and agriculture towards a more service-based economy. Most national bank institutions and other related financial organizations such as Bank of America and Key Bank base their Maine operations in Portland. Unum, Covetrus, TruChoice Federal Credit Union, People's United Bank, ImmuCell Corp, and Pioneer Telephone have headquarters here, and Portland's neighboring cities of South Portland, Westbrook and Scarborough, provide homes for other corporations including IDEXX and WEX Inc. Between 1867 and 2021, Burnham & Morrill Co., maker of B&M Baked Beans, had its main plant in Portland (the B&M Baked Beans factory).

The city's port is also undergoing a revival, and the first-ever container train departed from the new International Marine Terminal with fifteen containers of locally produced bottled tap water in early 2016.

Americold, a US-based international provider of temperature-controlled storage and distribution, won a bid to develop a state-of-the-art temperature-controlled storage facility adjacent to the port. The facility will support perishable produce, meats, and seafood imports with direct exports but construction has not yet begun.

In January 2020 Portland was announced to be the location of a new research institute that will focus on the application of artificial intelligence and machine learning. Northeastern University was selected by technology entrepreneur David Roux to lead the institute that will include programs that will allow graduate student research.

Portland also has a large subsidized housing industry with more than five large real estate companies entirely in the business.

Arts and culture

Portland has a long history of prominence in the arts, peaking the first time in the early nineteenth century, when the city was "a rival, and not a satellite of either Boston or New York". In that period, Henry Wadsworth Longfellow got his start as a poet and John Neal held a central position in leading American literature toward its great renaissance, having founded Maine's first literary periodical, The Yankee, in 1828. Other notable literary or artistic figures who got their start or were at their prime in that period include Grenville Mellen, Nathaniel Parker Willis, Seba Smith, Elizabeth Oakes Smith, Benjamin Paul Akers, Charles Codman, Franklin Simmons, John Rollin Tilton, and Harrison Bird Brown. Since 2000, Portland has hosted a monthly First Friday Art Walk event that attracts more than 3,000 visitors.

Sites of interest
The Arts District, centered on Congress Street, is home to the Portland Museum of Art, Portland Stage Company, Maine Historical Society & Museum, Portland Public Library, Maine College of Art, SPACE Gallery, Children's Museum of Maine, Merrill Auditorium, the Kotzschmar Memorial Organ, and Portland Symphony Orchestra, as well as many smaller art galleries and studios.

Baxter Boulevard around Back Cove, Deering Oaks Park, the Eastern Promenade, Western Promenade, Lincoln Park and Riverton Park are all historical parks within the city. Other parks and natural spaces include Payson Park, Post Office Park, Baxter Woods, Evergreen Cemetery, Western Cemetery and the Fore River Sanctuary.

Thompson's Point, in the Libbytown neighborhood, has been a focus of renovation and redevelopment during the 2010s. The location hosts a concert venue, ice rink, hotels, restaurants, wineries, and breweries.

Other sites of interest include:
Casco Bay Islands
Cross Insurance Arena
East End Beach
Exchange Street (the "Old Port" area)
Hadlock Field, home of the Portland Sea Dogs baseball team
International Cryptozoology Museum
Portland Exposition Building, home of the Maine Celtics basketball team
Longfellow Arboretum
Neal S. Dow House
Maine Narrow Gauge Railroad Museum
Martin's Point
McLellan-Sweat Mansion
The Portland Club
Portland Head Light Lighthouse
Portland Observatory
Portland Stage Company
University of New England (UNE)
University of Southern Maine (USM)
Victoria Mansion
Wadsworth-Longfellow House

Notable buildings

The spire of the Cathedral of the Immaculate Conception has been a notable feature of the Portland skyline since its completion in 1854. In 1859, Ammi B. Young designed the Marine Hospital, the first of three local works by Supervising Architects of the U.S. Treasury Department. Although the city lost to redevelopment its 1867 Greek Revival post office, which was designed by Alfred B. Mullett of white Vermont marble and featured a Corinthian portico, Portland retains his equally monumental 1872 granite Second Empire–Renaissance Revival custom house.

A more recent building of note is Franklin Towers, a 16-story residential tower completed in 1969. At , it is Portland's (as well as Maine's) tallest building. It is next to the Cathedral of the Immaculate Conception on the city skyline. During the building boom of the 1980s, several new buildings rose on the peninsula, including the 1983 Charles Shipman Payson Building by Henry N. Cobb of Pei, Cobb, Freed & Partners at the Portland Museum of Art complex (a component of which is the 1801 McLellan-Sweat Mansion), and the Back Bay Tower, a fifteen-story residential building completed in 1990.

477 Congress Street (known locally as the Time and Temperature Building) is situated near Monument Square in the Arts District and is a major landmark: the 14-story building features a large electronic sign on its roof that flashes time and temperature data, as well as parking ban information in the winter. The sign can be seen from nearly all of downtown Portland. The building is home to several radio stations. The Press Herald Building at 390 Congress Street is strategically located across Congress Street from Portland City Hall and was built in 1923 and then expanded in 1948 for use as the newspaper's headquarters.

The Westin Portland Harborview, completed in 1927, is a prominent hotel located downtown on High Street. Photographer Todd Webb lived in Portland during his later years and took many pictures of the city. Some of Webb's pictures can be found at the Evans Gallery.

Media

Portland is home to a concentration of publishing and broadcast companies, advertising agencies, web designers, commercial photography studios, and film makers.

The city is home to one daily newspaper, The Portland Press Herald/Maine Sunday Telegram, founded in 1862. The Press Herald is published Monday through Saturday and The Maine Sunday Telegram is published on Sundays. Both are published by MaineToday Media Inc., which also operates an entertainment website, MaineToday.com and owns papers in Augusta, Waterville, and Bath.

Portland is also covered by an alternative weekly newspaper, The Portland Phoenix, published by the Phoenix Media/Communications Group, which also produces a New England-wide news, arts, and entertainment website, thephoenix.com, and a twice-annual LGBT issues magazine, Out in Maine.

Other publications include The Portland Forecaster, a weekly newspaper; Mainer, a monthly alternative magazine formerly known as The Bollard; The West End News, The Munjoy Hill Observer, The Baysider, The Waterfront, Portland Magazine, and The Companion, an LGBT publication. Portland is also the home office of The Exception Magazine, an online newspaper that covers Maine.

The Portland broadcast media market is the largest one in Maine in both radio and television. Radio stations located in Portland include WFNK (Classic Hits), WJJB (Sports), WTHT (Country), WBQW (Classical), WHXR (Rock), WHOM (Adult Contemporary), WJBQ (Top 40), WCLZ (Adult Album Alternative), WBLM (Classic Rock), WYNZ (1960s–1970s Hits), and WCYY (Modern Rock). WMPG is a local non-commercial radio station run by community members and the University of Southern Maine. The Maine Public Broadcasting Network's (MPBN) radio news operations are based in Portland.

The area is served by local television stations representing most of the television networks. These stations include WCSH 6 (NBC), WMTW 8 (ABC), WGME 13 (CBS), WPFO 23 (Fox), WIPL 35 (ION), and WPXT 51 (The CW; MyNetworkTV on DT3). There is no PBS affiliate licensed to the city of Portland, but the market is served by MPBN outlets WCBB Channel 10 in Augusta and WMEA-TV Channel 26 Biddeford.

Historical newspapers
Historical newspapers formerly published in Portland are many and include Eastern Argus, Evening Express, The Pleasure Boat and The Portland Daily Sun.

Food and beverage

Number of restaurants
Downtown Portland, including the Arts District and the Old Port, has a high concentration of eating and drinking establishments, with many more to be found throughout the rest of the peninsula, outlying neighborhoods, and neighboring communities. The city is also home to numerous food trucks and food carts, which park on the city streets and at festivals, events and breweries. Most operate in the summer; a few operate year-round.

Notable restaurants include Fore Street, Duckfat, and Becky's Diner.

Food recognition
Portland has developed a national reputation for the quality of its restaurants, eateries, and food culture. The city has been visited by many food shows, including Rachael Ray's Food Network show $40 a Day, the Travel Channel's Man v. Food, and Anthony Bourdain: No Reservations. Bon Appetit named Portland the Restaurant City of the Year in 2018.

Beverages
Portland is home to numerous juice bars, coffee shops, coffee roasteries, tea houses, distilleries, microbreweries and brewpubs.

Brewers include the D. L. Geary Brewing Company, Gritty McDuff's Brewing Company, Shipyard Brewing Company, Casco Bay Brewing Co., and Allagash Brewing Company. Portland's spirits industry has also grown in recent years.

The city is known for its pure tap water. The water comes from Sebago Lake. It is piped to Portland by the Portland Water District. Sebago Lake is one of 50 surface water supplies among 13,000 in the country that the Environmental Protection Agency says do not need filtration.

Farmers markets
The Portland Farmers Market takes place Wednesdays in Monument Square, Saturdays in Deering Oaks Park (from early May to the end of November), and Saturdays at The Maine Girls Academy (from early December to the end of April).

Vegetarian food
The city has the state's most vegan and vegetarian restaurants, including the Green Elephant Vegetarian Bistro, which opened in 2007. Vegetarian-friendly restaurants number more than 200 in 2020, according to the Maine Sunday Telegram. Celebrity chef Toni Fiore first filmed the PBS cooking show Totally Vegetarian in 2002 at the cable access station in Portland. The Portland Press Herald has featured a vegan column by Avery Yale Kamila in its Food & Dining section since 2009. In 2011, the Portland Public Schools added a daily vegetarian cold lunch to its school menu choices. In 2019, the district changed to a daily hot vegan school meal option.

Food festivals
Portland hosts a number of food and beverage festivals, including:
Festival of Nations, takes place in July in Deering Oaks Park and organized by group of local organizations
Greek Festival, three-day event in June at Holy Trinity Greek Orthodox Church
Harvest on the Harbor, multi-day event takes place in October
Italian Street Festival & Bazaar, three-day event in August outside St. Peter's Parish commemorates the Feast of the Assumption of the Blessed Virgin Mary and the Feast of Saint Rocco
Maine Brewers Festival, held multiple times a year by the Maine Brewers' Guild
Maine VegFest, takes place in October and organized by Maine Animal Coalition since 2005; the event features all vegan food and was originally called Maine Vegetarian Food Festival
Taste of the Nation, fundraiser for food insecurity that stopped after 2015 but happened again in 2019
Maine Restaurant Week, takes place over 12 days in March
Maine Seaweed Week, takes place in the spring

Food history
Since 1768, the Portland Farmers Market has been in operation. It was first established in the Town Hall that "served 136 families on the peninsula."

Portland is where national Prohibition started. Portland mayor and temperance leader Neal Dow led Maine to ban alcohol sales in 1851. The law led to the Portland Rum Riot in 1855.

Canned corn was developed in Portland by the N. Winslow company. By 1852 the Winslow's Patent Hermetically Sealed Green Corn was a commercial success and the company became a world leader in the canning industry. An historic B&M Baked Beans canning plant built in 1913 operated on the waterfront until 2021 when it closed and production moved to the midwest. By late 2022, B&M customers were reporting that the baked beans were undercooked, crunchy, and tasted different. Customers speculated that the beans were no longer being baked. Some customers were hoarding B&M bean cans produced at the Portland plant.

In 1845, The Pleasure Boat was the earliest vegetarian publication in Maine. In the 1970s and 1980s, The Hollow Reed was a notable vegetarian restaurant on Fore Street.

In the early 20th century, a Little Italy neighborhood developed around India Street. The city's Amato's Italian delicatessen on India Street is reported to be the birthplace of the Italian sandwich, called "an Italian" by locals, which Amato's first served in 1902. The Village Restaurant, an Italian restaurant in the city's East End, was in operation for 71 years, from 1936 to 2007. In 1949, Miccuci's Grocery Co. opened on India Street and remains in business.

In 2015, Marcy's Diner made international headlines following a spat between the then-cook-owner and a patron over the latter's screaming child.

Sports
The city is home to three minor league teams. The Portland Sea Dogs, the Double-A farm team of the Boston Red Sox, play at Hadlock Field. The Maine Celtics, the NBA G League affiliate of the Boston Celtics, play at the Portland Exposition Building. The GPS Portland Phoenix soccer teams plays in USL League Two.

Previously, Portland was home of several minor league ice hockey teams: the Maine Nordiques (NAHL) from 1973 to 1977, the Maine Mariners (AHL) from 1977 to 1992, and the Portland Pirates (AHL) from 1993 to 2016. The Mariners were three-time Calder Cup winners. In 2018, another Maine Mariners, an ECHL team, returned a minor league hockey team to Portland.

The Maine Mammoths of the National Arena League played in 2018 and were the first indoor football team to call Portland home. The team suspended operations after one season while it negotiated with local ownership groups.

The Portland Sports Complex, located off of Park and Brighton Avenues near I-295 and Deering Oaks park, houses several of the city's stadiums and arenas, including:
Hadlock Field – baseball (Capacity 7,368)
Fitzpatrick Stadium – football, soccer, lacrosse, field hockey, and outdoor track (Capacity 6,000+ seated)
Portland Exposition Building – basketball, indoor track, concerts and trade shows (Capacity 3,000)
Portland Ice Arena – hockey and figure skating (Capacity 400)

Cross Insurance Arena has 6,733 permanent seats following renovation in 2014.

The Portland area has eleven professional golf courses, 124 tennis courts, and 95 playgrounds.

Portland hosts the Maine Marathon each October.

Bayside Bowl was expanded in 2017 to 20 lanes, including a rooftop deck. It hosted the 2017 PBA League and Elias Cup.

Memorial Stadium is the home of the Deering High School sports teams and is located behind the school.

Parks and recreation
The city of Portland includes more than 700 acres of open space and public parks. The city and surrounding communities are linked by 70 miles of trails, both urban and wooded, maintained by the nonprofit Portland Trails. The Portland Parks Conservancy, which was established in 2019, is a nonprofit organization that raises money to support Portland's park system. In 2021, the Portland Parks Conservancy funded the establishment of the Portland Youth Corp. The Portland Youth Corp performs work in Portland's parks and residents between the ages of 14 and 16 can apply to participate in the paid program.

The city requires organic land care techniques be used on both public and private property. In 2018, the Portland City Council banned the use of synthetic pesticides. In 2020, the city received a $10,000 grant from Hannaford, Stonyfield Farm, and Osborn Organics to pay for soil tests and other start up costs of transitioning the heavily used Fox Field in Kennedy Park to an organic maintenance plan.

Well-known and historic parks include:
Deering Oaks Park
Eastern Promenade
Western Promenade
Baxter Boulevard
Lincoln Park
Congress Square Park
Payson Park
East End Beach
East End Trail
Bayside Trail
Kennedy Park
Riverside Municipal Golf Course
Fort Sumner Park
Baxter Woods
Fore River Sanctuary
Quarry Run Dog Park
Riverton Trolley Park
Parks with splash pads and pools:

 Deering Oaks Ravine
 Kiwanis Pool
 Peppermint Park
 Payson Park
 Stone Street Playground

Government

The city has adopted a council-manager style government that is detailed in the city charter. The citizens of Portland are represented by a nine-member city council which makes policy, passes ordinances, approves appropriations, appoints the city manager and oversees the municipal government. The city council of nine members is elected by the citizens of Portland. The city has five voting districts, with each district electing a city councilor to represent their neighborhood interests for a three-year term. There are also four members of the city council who are elected at-large. The four at-large members are elected through Proportional ranked-choice voting.

From 1923 until 2011, city councilors chose one of themselves each year to serve as Mayor of Portland, a primarily ceremonial position. On November 2, 2010, Portland voters narrowly approved a measure that allowed them to elect the mayor. On November 8, 2011, former State Senator and candidate for U.S. Congress Michael F. Brennan was elected as mayor. On December 5, 2011, he was sworn in as the first citizen-elected mayor in 88 years (see Portland, Maine mayoral election, 2011). The office of mayor is a four-year position that earns a salary of 150% of the city's median income. The current mayor is Kate Snyder, who defeated incumbent mayor Ethan Strimling in the 2019 Portland, Maine mayoral election.

A city manager is appointed by the city council. The city manager oversees the daily operations of the city government, appoints the heads of city departments, and prepares annual budgets. The city manager directs all city agencies and departments, and is responsible for the executing laws and policies passed by the city council. The current city manager is Jon Jennings.

Aside from the main city council, there is also an elected school board for the Portland Public School system. The school board is made up in the same manner of the city council, with five district members, four at-large members and one chairman. There are also three students from the local high schools elected to serve on the board. There are many other boards and committees such as the Planning Committee, Board of Appeals, and Harbor Commission, etc. These committees and boards have limited power in their respective areas of expertise. Members of boards and committees are appointed by city council members.

On November 5, 2013, Portland voters overwhelmingly approved an ordinance to legalize the possession and private use of cannabis for adults, making the city the first municipality in the Eastern United States to do so.

James E. Craig was chief of the Portland Police Department from 2009 to 2011. He would later go on to become the chief of the Cincinnati Police Department and Detroit Police Department.

In the U.S. House of Representatives, Portland is included in Maine's 1st congressional district and is currently represented by Democrat Chellie M. Pingree.

Voter registration

Education

High schools
Baxter Academy for Technology and Science (charter)
Casco Bay High School (public-expeditionary)
Cheverus High School (private)
Deering High School (public)
Portland Arts & Technology High School (public-vocational)
Portland High School (public)
Waynflete School (private)

Colleges and universities
College expansions underway in 2022 at the University of Southern Maine to add a 580-bed dorm, at the University of New England to move the medical school from Biddeford into a new $93 million building on the Portland campus, and at the Northeastern University Roux Institute to build a campus on the site of the former B&M Bean plant have the potential, within two decades, to bring the total college and university students in the city to 15,000, which would be similar to the percentage of students in Boston.
Maine College of Art
Northeastern University Roux Institute 
University of Maine School of Law
University of New England
University of Southern Maine

Infrastructure

Fire department
The Portland Fire Department (PFD) provides fire protection and emergency medical services to the city of Portland 24/7, 365. Established on March 29, 1768, the PFD is made up of over 230 paid, professional firefighters and operates out of seven Fire Stations, located throughout the city, in addition to Fire Stations staffed by "on-call" firefighters on Peaks Island; Great Diamond Island; Cushing Island; and Cliff Island. The Portland Fire Department also operates an Airport Division Station at 1001 Westbrook St., at the Portland International Jetport, and a Marine Division Station, located at 54 Commercial St.

Police

The Portland Police Department is the largest municipal police department in the state of Maine. In 2022, WalletHub listed Portland as the fourth safest city in America.

Hospitals

Maine Medical Center is the state's only Level I trauma center and is the largest hospital in Maine.

Mercy Hospital, a faith-based institution, is the fourth largest in the state. It completed the first phase of its new campus along the Fore River in 2008.

The formerly-independent Brighton Medical Center (once known as the Osteopathic Hospital) is now owned by Maine Medical Center and is operated as a minor care center under the names Brighton First Care and New England Rehab. In 2010, Maine Medical Center's Hannaford Center for Safety, Innovation, and Simulation opened at the Brighton campus. The former Portland General Hospital is now home to the Barron Center nursing facility.

Wastewater management

One wastewater management project is named the Bedford Street Sewer Separation, with its goal to "improve the water quality and health of Back Cove by reducing the amount of combined sewer overflows (CSO) that over flow during heavy rain events through the use of sewer separation and water treatment devices."

Transportation

Roads

Portland is accessible from I-95 (the Maine Turnpike), I-295, and US 1. U.S. Route 302, a major travel route and scenic highway between Maine and Vermont, has its eastern terminus in Portland. State Routes include SR 9, SR 22, SR 25, SR 26, SR 77, and SR 100. SR 25 Business goes through southwestern Portland.

Intercity buses and trains
Amtrak's Downeaster service offers five daily trains connecting the city's station with eight towns and cities to the south, ending at Boston's North Station. Trains also go north to Freeport and Brunswick.

Concord Coach Lines bus service connects Portland to 14 other communities in Maine as well as to Boston's South Station and Logan Airport. Both the Downeaster and the Concord Coach Lines can be found at the Portland Transportation Center on Thompsons Point Road, in the Libbytown neighborhood.

The city bus service is provided by Greater Portland Metro.

Airports
Commercial air service is available at the Portland International Jetport, located in Stroudwater, west of the city's downtown district. American, Southwest, JetBlue, Delta, and United Airlines service the airport. Direct flights are available to Atlanta, Baltimore, Charlotte, Chicago, Detroit, Philadelphia, New York, Newark, Sarasota, and Washington, D.C.

Water transportation

The Port of Portland is the second-largest cruise and passenger destination in the state (next to Bar Harbor) and is served by the Ocean Gateway International Marine Passenger Terminal. Ferry service is available year-round to many destinations in Casco Bay. From 2006 to 2009, Bay Ferries operated a high speed ferry called The Cat featuring a five-hour trip to Yarmouth, Nova Scotia, for summer passengers and cars. In years past the Scotia Prince Cruises trip took eleven hours. A proposal to replace the defunct Nova Scotia ferry service was rejected in 2013 by the province. From May 15, 2014, until October 2015, the cruise ship ferry Nova Star made daily trips to Yarmouth, Nova Scotia. Due to poor passenger numbers and financial problems, Nova Scotia selected Bay Ferries, the prior operator of The Cat, to operate the service starting in 2016, citing the company's experience and industry relationships. Nova Star officials pledged a smooth transition to the new operator. The Nova Star was later ordered seized by federal marshals for nonpayment of bills.

Bay Ferries announced on March 24, 2016, the charter of the former Hawaii Superferry boat HST-2 from the US Navy for the Portland-Yarmouth service for two years. Bay Ferries signed a ten-year deal with Nova Scotia to run the ferry route, which will take about five and a half hours each way. They stated that the boat would be renamed The Cat and that service would begin around June 15, after refitting in South Carolina. There is still a dispute as to whether the ferry will be permitted to carry trucks, desired by Nova Scotia businesses but opposed by the City of Portland.

The Casco Bay Lines operate several passenger ferries with dozens of trips every day year-round to the major populated islands of Casco Bay. The service to Peaks Island also provides an auto ferry for most of its schedule.

Notable people

Sister cities
Portland's sister cities are:
 Arkhangelsk, Russia
 Cap-Haïtien, Haiti
 Mytilene, Greece
 Shinagawa (Tokyo), Japan

See also

Mayor of Portland, Maine
USS Portland (LSD-37)

Notes

References
General
History of Portland from 1632 to 1864 by Wm. Willis (1865)
History of Portland, Maine (1886)

Specific

Further reading
John F. Bauman. Gateway to Vacationland: The Making of Portland Maine (University of Massachusetts Press: 2012) 285 pages; Explores the socio-economic, political and cultural history of Portland emphasizing the evolution of the city's built environment after the fire of 1866.
 Chen, Xiangming, ed. Confronting Urban Legacy: Rediscovering Hartford and New England's Forgotten Cities (2015) excerpt

Michael C. Connolly. Seated by the Sea: The Maritime History of Portland, Maine, and Its Irish Longshoremen (University Press of Florida; 2010) 280 pages; Focuses on the years 1880 to 1923 in a study of how an influx of Irish immigrant workers transformed the city's waterfront.

External links

Portland's Downtown District
Greater Portland Casco Bay Convention and Visitors Bureau
Old USGS maps of Portland Area.
1876 Panoramic Birdseye View of Portland by Warner at LOC.
Guide to the Western Promenade, Portland, Maine, Portlandlandmarks.org

 
Cities in Cumberland County, Maine
Casco Bay
County seats in Maine
Populated coastal places in Maine
.
Port cities and towns in Maine
Populated places established in 1633
1633 establishments in the Thirteen Colonies
Maine
Cities in Maine